The 1905–06 collegiate men's basketball season in the United States began in December 1905, progressed through the regular season, and concluded in March 1906.

Season headlines 

 The Western Conference (the future Big Ten Conference) sponsored its first conference basketball season and recognized a regular-season champion for the first time.
 In February 1943, the Helms Athletic Foundation retroactively selected Dartmouth as its national champion for the 1905–06 season.
 In 1995, the Premo-Porretta Power Poll retroactively selected Wabash as its national champion for the 1905–06 season.

Conference membership changes

Regular season

Conference winners

Statistical leaders

Awards

Helms College Basketball All-Americans 

The practice of selecting a Consensus All-American Team did not begin until the 1928–29 season. The Helms Athletic Foundation later retroactively selected a list of All-Americans for the 1905–06 season.

Major player of the year awards 

 Helms Player of the Year: George Grebenstein, Dartmouth (retroactive selection in 1944)

Coaching changes 

A number of teams changed coaches during the season and after it ended.

References